Coihueco Airport  is an airport serving the town of Coihueco in Bío Bío Region, Chile.

See also

 List of airports in Chile
 Transport in Chile

References

External links
 HERE Maps - Coihueco
 OpenStreetMap - Coihueco
 OurAirports - Coihueco
 Coihueco - FallingRain
 Skyvector Aeronautical Charts - Coihueco

Airports in Chile
Chile transport-related lists